Zélie Lardé Arthés (1901–1974) was a Salvadoran painter, considered the first Primitivist painter in El Salvador.

Biography 
Zélie Lardé was born on 11 August 1901 in San Salvador, El Salvador. Her brother was a scientist and archaeologist Jorge Lardé y Arthés. Her sister, Alice Lardé de Venturino was also a poet, and pedagogue in El Salvador.

In 1923, Zelié married the Salvadoran artist Salazar Arrué. They had three daughters - María Teresa,  Aída Estela, and Olga Teresa. She later became the mother in law to the famous United States mathematician John Forbes Nash. 

Zélie Lardé was a self-taught practitioner in arts and painting. She was the first in El Salvador to adopt the Russian art movement Primitivism, which later became a large movement in the 1970s in El Salvador.

In 1974 she died in San Salvador, battling cancer.

Most famous works 

The majority of her works were represented by expressionist strokes of thick lines, using pure colors to express scenes of traditional Salvadoran daily life of peasants and lower society, as well as marginal sectors. The majority of her work can be found as illustrations in the first edition of the book by Salazar Aruebe - "Cuentes de Cipotes" (1961).

Other notable works of hers include:

 "Cuentos de cipotes", 1961
 Día de Fiesta
 Recreo de escuela
 Familia

References 

1901 births
1974 deaths
Salvadoran painters